Rachel Allen: Bake! is an Irish cookery television show presented by Rachel Allen and broadcast on RTÉ One each Wednesday at 7:30pm. The first episode aired on 15 October 2008. Each episode was made available to watch online for 21 days after original transmission.

In the United Kingdom, the show airs from time to time on the Good Food channel, it has also become part of the Saturday morning schedule on BBC One. In the United States, it airs on Cooking Channel.

Episodes

Recipes
 Calzone Puttanesca
 Lemon cupcakes
 Pissaladiere
 Red Velvet Cake
 Spinach, potato and goat's cheese tart
 Coconut meringue roulade with lemon curd cream and raspberries
 Baked cheesecake with blueberries

References

External links
 Chef Allen's official site
 Bake!'s official site

Irish cooking television series